Aaron Seton is an Australian racing driver. He is the son of former Australian Touring Car Championship winner Glenn Seton, and grandson of former Bathurst 1000 winner Barry Seton.

Biography
He debuted in the Dunlop Super2 Series for Matt Stone Racing in 2021.

He is scheduled to drive in the 2022 Bathurst 1000 driving alongside Jack Le Brocq for Matt Stone Racing.

Career summary

Complete Bathurst 1000 results

References

Further reading
 The Courier Mail

Australian racing drivers
1998 births
Living people
Matt Stone Racing drivers